The Livingston Group is a geological formation in Montana whose strata date back to the Late Cretaceous. Dinosaur remains are among the fossils that have been recovered from the formation.

There are four units of the Livingston Group (from oldest to youngest): Cokedale Formation, Miner Creek Formation, Billman Creek Formation, and Hoppers Formation.

See also

 List of dinosaur-bearing rock formations

References

Cretaceous Montana
Paleogene Montana